AE Aurigae (abbreviated as AE Aur) is a runaway star in the constellation Auriga; it lights the Flaming Star Nebula.

Description

AE Aurigae is a blue O-type main sequence dwarf with a mean apparent magnitude of +6.0.  It is classified as an Orion type variable star and its brightness varies irregularly between magnitudes +5.78 and +6.08.  It is approximately 1,300 light-years from Earth.

AE Aur is a runaway star that might have been ejected during a collision of two binary star groups. This collision, which also is credited with ejecting Mu Columbae and possibly 53 Arietis, has been traced to the Trapezium cluster in the Orion Nebula two million years ago.  The binary Iota Orionis may have been the other half of this collision.

AE Aur is seen to light up the Flaming Star nebula, but it was not formed within it.  Instead it is passing through the nebula at high speed and producing a violent bow shock and high energy electromagnetic radiation.

Companions
Possibly due to its runaway star nature, AE Aurigae has no physical companion stars, although some nearby stars have been erroneously identified as ones. A theoretical companion 1000 AU (0.016 light-years) away from AE Aurigae would have an angular separation of less than 2.5 arcseconds and would probably be lost in the star's glare.

References

External links 
 AE Aurigae Jim Kaler
 AE Aur VizieR GCVS entry
 HR 1712 VizieR Bright star catalogue entry
 AE Aurigae Aladin image
 CCDM J05163+3419 VizieR Catalog of Components of Double and Multiple Stars entry

O-type main-sequence stars
Runaway stars
Orion variables
Auriga (constellation)
Durchmusterung objects
034078
024575
1712
Aurigae, AE